Ben-Hur: A Tale of the Christ is a 1925 American silent epic adventure-drama film directed by Fred Niblo and written by June Mathis based on the 1880 novel Ben-Hur: A Tale of the Christ by General Lew Wallace. Starring Ramon Novarro as the title character, the film is the first feature-length adaptation of the novel and second overall, following the 1907 short.

In 1997, Ben-Hur was selected for preservation in the United States National Film Registry by the Library of Congress as being "culturally, historically, or aesthetically significant."

Plot

Ben-Hur is a wealthy young Jewish prince and boyhood friend of the powerful Roman tribune, Messala. When an accident and a false accusation leads to Ben-Hur's arrest, Messala, who has become corrupt and arrogant, makes sure Ben-Hur and his family are jailed and separated.

Ben-Hur is sentenced to slave labor in a Roman war galley. Along the way, he unknowingly encounters Jesus, the carpenter's son who offers him water. Once aboard ship, his attitude of defiance and strength impresses a Roman admiral, Quintus Arrius, who allows him to remain unchained. This actually works in the admiral's favor because when his ship is attacked and sunk by pirates, Ben-Hur saves him from drowning.

Arrius then treats Ben-Hur as a son, and over the years the young man grows strong and becomes a victorious chariot racer. This eventually leads to a climactic showdown with Messala in a chariot race, in which Ben-Hur is the victor. However, Messala does not die, as he does in the more famous 1959 adaptation of the novel.

Ben-Hur is eventually reunited with his mother and sister, who have developed leprosy but are miraculously cured by Jesus Christ.

Cast

Main
 Ramon Novarro as Ben-Hur
 Francis X. Bushman as Messala
 May McAvoy as Esther
 Betty Bronson as Mary
 Claire McDowell as Princess of Hur
 Kathleen Key as Tirzah
 Carmel Myers as Iras
 Nigel de Brulier as Simonides
 Mitchell Lewis as Sheik Ilderim
 Leo White as Sanballat
 Frank Currier as Arrius
 Charles Belcher as Balthazar
 Dale Fuller as Amrah
 Winter Hall as Joseph
 Claude Payton as Jesus Christ (uncredited)
 George Walsh (he recorded almost the entire film, but was replaced by Ramon Novarro)

Some notable crowd extras during chariot race
 Reginald Barker
 John Barrymore
 Lionel Barrymore
 Clarence Brown
 Joan Crawford
 Marion Davies
 Douglas Fairbanks
 George Fitzmaurice
 Sidney Franklin
 John Gilbert
 Dorothy Gish
 Lillian Gish
 Samuel Goldwyn
 Sid Grauman
 Rupert Julian
 Henry King
 Harold Lloyd
 Carole Lombard
 Myrna Loy
 Colleen Moore
 Mary Pickford

ProductionBen-Hur: A Tale of The Christ had been a great success as a novel, and was adapted into a stage play which ran for twenty-five years. In 1922, two years after the play's last tour, the Goldwyn company purchased the film rights to Ben-Hur. The play's producer, Abraham Erlanger, put a heavy price on the screen rights. Erlanger was persuaded to accept a generous profit participation deal and total approval over every detail of the production.

Choosing the title role was difficult for June Mathis. Rudolph Valentino and dancer Paul Swan were considered until George Walsh was chosen. When asked why she chose him, she answered it was because of his eyes and his body. Gertrude Olmstead was cast as Esther. While on location in Italy, Walsh was fired and replaced by Ramon Novarro. The role of Esther went to May McAvoy.

Shooting began in Rome, Italy in October 1923 under the direction of Charles Brabin who was replaced shortly after filming began. Additional recastings (including Ramon Novarro as Ben-Hur) and a change of director caused the production's budget to skyrocket. After two years of difficulties and accidents, the production was eventually moved back to Metro-Goldwyn-Mayer in Culver City, California and production resumed in the spring of 1925. B. Reeves Eason and Christy Cabanne directed the second unit footage.

Production costs eventually rose to $3,900,000 ($ today) compared to MGM's average for the season of $158,000 ($ today), making Ben-Hur the most expensive film of the silent era.

Film historian and critic Kevin Brownlow has described the race sequence as "breathtakingly exciting, and as creative a piece of cinema as the Odessa Steps sequence from Battleship Potemkin", a Soviet film also released in 1925 and directed by Sergei Eisenstein, who introduced many modern concepts of editing and montage composition to motion-picture production. Visual elements of the chariot race have been much imitated. The race's opening sequence was re-created shot-for-shot in the 1959 remake, copied in the 1998 animated film The Prince of Egypt, and imitated in the pod race scene in the 1999 film Star Wars: Episode I – The Phantom Menace.MrRazNZ (2021). , scene-by-scene video comparison of race in Star Wars: Episode I – The Phantom Menace with the races in Ben Hur and in the 1975 Norwegian stop-motion animated feature The Pinchcliffe Grand Prix; uploaded 12 August 2021 to YouTube (San Bruno, California). Retrieved 13 August 2021.

Some of the scenes in the 1925 film were shot in two-color Technicolor, most notably the sequences involving Jesus. One of the assistant directors for this sequence was a young William Wyler, who would direct the 1959 MGM remake. The black-and-white footage was color tinted and toned in the film's original release print. MGM released a second remake of  Ben-Hur in 2016.

Reception

The studio's publicity department was relentless in promoting the film, advertising it with lines like: "The Picture Every Christian Ought to See!" and "The Supreme Motion Picture Masterpiece of All Time". Ben Hur went on to become MGM's highest-grossing film, with rentals of $9 million worldwide. Its foreign earnings of $5 million were not surpassed at MGM for at least 25 years.  Despite the large revenues, its huge expenses and the deal with Erlanger made it a net financial loss for MGM. It recorded an overall loss of $698,000.

In terms of publicity and prestige however, it was a great success. "The screen has yet to reveal anything more exquisitely moving than the scenes at Bethlehem, the blazing of the star in the heavens, the shepherds and the Wise Men watching. The gentle, radiant Madonna of Betty Bronson's is a masterpiece," wrote a reviewer for Photoplay. "No one," they concluded, "no matter what his age or religion, should miss it. And take the children." It helped establish the new MGM as a major studio.

The film was re-released in 1931 with an added musical score, by the original composers William Axt and David Mendoza, and sound effects. As the decades passed, the original two-color Technicolor segments were replaced by alternative black-and-white takes. Ben-Hur earned $1,352,000 during its re-release, including $1,153,000 of foreign earnings, and made a profit of $779,000 meaning it had an overall profit of $81,000. The review aggregator website Rotten Tomatoes reported that 96% of critics have given the film a positive review based on 23 reviews, with an average rating of 7.8/10.

The film became notorious after its release for the egregious animal abuse involved in filming. A reported one hundred horses were tripped and killed merely to produce the set piece footage of the major chariot race. Animal advocates especially criticized the use of the "running W" on set, a wire device that could trip a galloping horse. It would take a decade before such devices lost favor in Hollywood.

The movie was banned in the 1930s in China under the category of "superstitious films" due to its religious subject matter involving gods and deities.

Restoration
The Technicolor scenes were considered lost until the 1980s when Turner Entertainment (who by then had acquired the rights to the MGM film library) found the crucial sequences in a Czechoslovakian film archive. Current prints of the 1925 version are from the Turner-supervised restoration which includes the color tints and Technicolor sections set to resemble the original theatrical release. There is an addition of a newly recorded stereo orchestral soundtrack by Carl Davis with the London Philharmonic Orchestra which was originally recorded for a Thames Television screening of the movie.

Home mediaBen-Hur was released on DVD, complete with the Technicolor segments, in the four-disc collector's edition of the 1959 version starring Charlton Heston, as well as in the 2011 "Fiftieth Anniversary Edition" Blu-ray Collector's Edition three-disc box set.

See also
 List of films featuring slavery
 Francis X. Bushman filmography
 List of films with a 100% rating on Rotten Tomatoes, a film review aggregator website

References
Explanatory notes

Citations

Further reading
 Keel, A. Chester, "The Fiasco of 'Ben Hur'," Photoplay, November 1924, p. 32.

External linksBen-Hur essay by Fritzi Kramer at National Film Registry.Ben-Hur essay by Daniel Eagan in America's Film Legacy: The Authoritative Guide to the Landmark Movies in the National Film Registry'', A&C Black, 2010 , pages 109-111 

 
 
 
 

1925 films
1920s adventure drama films
1920s color films
American adventure drama films
American epic films
American silent feature films
Animal cruelty incidents in film
Articles containing video clips
Ben-Hur films
Censored films
Films directed by Fred Niblo
Films directed by Charles Brabin 
Films produced by Louis B. Mayer
Films shot in Los Angeles
Films shot in Italy
Films shot in Rome
Films partially in color
Metro-Goldwyn-Mayer films
Portrayals of Jesus in film
Portrayals of the Virgin Mary in film
Religious epic films
Silent films in color
United States National Film Registry films
Works banned in China
1925 drama films
Early color films
1920s American films
Silent American drama films
Silent adventure drama films
1920s English-language films